Justice Tod or Todd may refer to:

Debra Todd (born 1957), associate justice of the Supreme Court of Pennsylvania
George Tod (judge) (1773–1841), associate justice of the Supreme Court of Ohio
John Tod (1779–1830), associate justice of the Supreme Court of Pennsylvania
John J. Todd (born 1927), associate justice of the Minnesota Supreme Court
Robert Barr Todd (1826–1901), associate justice of the Louisiana Supreme Court